Jyve V is a Puerto Rican Latin pop band which got its first public exposure when they won dance contest "La Batalla de los Sexos" (Battle of the Sexes) in 1997. Next year they won another dance contest held in Miami Beach, Florida. Jyve V did originally start as three member group consisting of Alex and brothers Jasond and Rafael. Chelo joined Jyve V in 1999. The band name comes from dance style jive, and number of group members. Chelo's solo album 360 ° was released in June 2006.

Discography

Albums 
 Jyve V, March 14, 2000
 Solar, November 20, 2001

Compilations 
 15 de Colección, September 21, 2004

Song "Magic of the Night" is theme for Destination Stardom television show on Pax TV network.

Song "Sólo a Tu Lado Quiero Vivir" (I want to spend my whole life with you) is theme for Venezuelan telenovela Juana la virgen (Juana the virgin).

External links 
 Music of Puerto Rico – Jyve V

Puerto Rican musical groups